Francesc Vicent (1450 in Segorbe – c. 1512) was a Spanish author who wrote the first treatise about chess using the present-day moves for the queen and the bishop. Libre dels jochs partits dels schacs en nombre de 100 was printed in Valencia on May 15, 1495, by Lope de Roca Alemany and Pere Trincher. No copy of this work has survived. It is assumed that the book contained 100 endgames. It is believed that there was a copy in the library of Santa Maria de Montserrat, but this was destroyed by the occupying French forces in 1811 during the Peninsular War.

Vicent is considered the founder of modern chess.  As his work spread throughout Europe, the innovation of the queen's change in movement making it the most powerful chess piece appeared for the first time in the poem Scachs d'amor (1475) written by Bernat Fenollar, Narcís Vinyoles and Franci de Castellví. This has been presented as evidence that the modern queen's move is a Spanish invention.

The asteroid 78071 Vicent, discovered in 2002, is named after him.

References 

1450 births
1512 deaths
People from Segorbe
Spanish chess writers
Medieval Catalan-language writers
15th-century people from the Kingdom of Aragon